The 2021 Tali Open was a professional tennis tournament played on hard courts. It was the second edition of the tournament which was part of the 2021 ATP Challenger Tour. It took place in Helsinki, Finland between November 15 and November 21, 2021.

Singles main-draw entrants

Seeds

 1 Rankings are as of 8 November 2021.

Other entrants
The following players received wildcards into the singles main draw:
  Jack Draper
  Patrik Niklas-Salminen
  Otto Virtanen

The following player received entry into the singles main draw as a special exempt:
  Zsombor Piros

The following players received entry into the singles main draw as alternates:
  Matthias Bachinger
  Julian Lenz

The following players received entry from the qualifying draw:
  Joris De Loore
  Jonáš Forejtek
  Shintaro Mochizuki
  Alexander Shevchenko

The following player received entry as a lucky loser:
  Kyrian Jacquet

Champions

Singles

 Alex Molčan def.  João Sousa 6–3, 6–2.

Doubles

 Alexander Erler /  Lucas Miedler def.  Harri Heliövaara /  Jean-Julien Rojer 6–3, 7–6(7–2).

References

2021 ATP Challenger Tour
2021 in Finnish sport
November 2021 sports events in Europe